2IFC may refer to:

 Two-interval forced choice, a psychophysical method
 Two International Finance Centre (Hong Kong), the second tallest building in Hong Kong